The Bietigheim Viaduct is a well-known German railway bridge over the Enz valley at Bietigheim-Bissingen and one of the landmarks of the city. Construction began in 1851 and completion occurred on 20 September 1853 under the direction of Karl Etzel as part of the Western Railway between Bietigheim and Bruchsal. The Bietigheim Viaduct is a bricked stone construction with two rows of arches. The viaduct is approximately 287 metres long, approximately 33 metres high and has 21 arches, which extend over the Enz valley. Six arches were destroyed at the end of the Second World War; after that an auxiliary bridge, which was opened on 1 August 1945 was erected beside it, some foundations of which are still visible. The damaged columns were later restored, although one of the arches had to be completely filled with concrete. Directly beside the Bietigheim Viaduct is the festival area of Bietigheim Bissingen, on which the Bietigheim Horse Market, a beer festival, takes place annually at the beginning of September.

References

Railway bridges in Germany
Bridges completed in 1853
Viaducts in Germany
Buildings and structures in Ludwigsburg (district)